

Events

Publications

Births 
 18 May 1872 - Bertrand Russell (died 1970)

Deaths

References

Philosophy
19th-century philosophy
Philosophy by year